John Rogers (1723 – September 23, 1789) was a Founding Father of the United States, who served as a lawyer and judge from Upper Marlboro, Maryland. Rogers was a delegate for Maryland to the Continental Congress in 1775—1776, when he voted for the Declaration of Independence but became ill before he could sign it. Rogers was Maryland's Chancellor, the equivalent of governor, from 1778 until his death 11 years later.

Revolutionary career
Rogers was a member of the committee of safety in 1774 and 1775, and a member of the Maryland provincial conventions in 1774, 1775, and 1776, in addition to being a member of the Continental Congress. He was the "second major of battalion" for Prince George's County. In 1776 he was a judge of the court of admiralty. He was one of three Maryland delegates to the Congress who voted in July 1776, to declare America's independence from Great Britain and to approve the Declaration of Independence.  Because of his subsequent illness, Rogers' signature does not appear on the actual Declaration document.  He is the only delegate who voted for the Declaration, but did not sign it.

In 1777 Rogers was a member of the executive council on the organization of the state government and was elected as a United States Presidential elector from Maryland in 1788.

Judicial career
From 1778 until his death Rogers was Chancellor of Maryland.

Death and legacy
Rogers died in Annapolis in September, 1789. Although the site of his grave is unknown, a memorial marker honoring him is on the grounds of the Prince Georges County administration building.

References

1723 births
1789 deaths
Continental Congressmen from Maryland
18th-century American politicians
Maryland militiamen in the American Revolution
People of Maryland in the American Revolution